Cynodontidae, also known as dogtooth characins or vampire tetras, are a family of predatory, characiform freshwater fishes from South America. This group is not very diverse, and includes only five genera and 14 species.

Physical characteristics
Cynodontidae are elongated in shape with a silvery or grey colour and an upturned mouth. Some species have a hunchbacked appearance. The family names (both scientific and common) derive from the long and well-developed canines which are used to spear their prey, mainly other fish. Their pectoral fins are also expanded.

Distribution and habitat
These fish live in midlevel to surface waters of rivers, lakes, and flooded forests. Most species of this family originate from the Orinoco and Amazon basins, as well as rivers of the Guianas. One species, Rhaphiodon vulpinus, ranges as far south as the Paraná-Paraguay and Uruguay basins, and Gilbertolus is found in the  Atrato, Magdalena and Maracaibo basins. Fossil species are also known from Argentina.

Relationship to humans
Hydrolycus species are game fish, having been recently added to the International Game Fish Association in the fly and rod class. Cynodontid fish are also sometimes kept in aquaria.

See also
 List of fish families

References

 
Taxa named by Carl H. Eigenmann
Ray-finned fish families